Anchitherium (meaning near beast) was a fossil horse with a three-toed hoof. 
 
Anchitherium was a browsing (leaf eating) horse that originated in the early Miocene of North America and subsequently dispersed to Europe and Asia, where it gave rise to the larger bodied genus Sinohippus.

References

Miocene horses
Prehistoric placental genera
Miocene mammals of North America
Miocene mammals of Asia
Miocene mammals of Europe
Fossil taxa described in 1844